To be floral is to pertain to flowers.

Floral may also refer to:

 Floral, Arkansas, an unincorporated community in the United States
 Floral, Kansas, an unincorporated community in the United States
 Floral, Saskatchewan, an unincorporated community in Canada
 Floral Street, London, England

See also
 Flora (disambiguation)
 Floral Hall (disambiguation)